The Peugeot armoured car was a four-wheeled armoured vehicle based on a commercial Peugeot truck that was quickly developed by the French in 1914 for use during the First World War.

Design
The Peugeot armoured car was built in two main versions, the Peugeot AM ("automitrailleuse") was armed with an  Hotchkiss Model 1914 machine gun, and the Peugeot AC ("autocannon") armed with a  Hotchkiss M1887 gun. The two armaments were interchangeable and were mounted on a pivot mount fitted with a curved gun shield.

The main production models of the Peugeot armoured car were built on the Peugeot 18 CV ("cheval-vapeur" or horsepower) type 146 or type 148 chassis. The Peugeot armoured car had a front mounted engine, driver in the middle and open topped fighting compartment at the rear. To support the additional weight of the armour and armament, the chassis and suspension were strengthened and double wheels were used on the rear. The driver’s position was protected by well sloped armour, the engine was armoured with steel shutters protecting the radiator.

History

Later in the year a purpose designed version was developed, designed Captain Reynault it was based on the larger type 146 chassis. The new design provided armoured protection for the engine and fighting compartment and a more enclosed gun shield for the armament, although the top remained open. 150 were built, later in the production run the type 146 chassis was supplemented by the type 148 chassis.

Service
From 1915 the Western Front had bogged down in trench warfare and there was little use in French service for these cars, some being used for rear area patrols. By 1918 only 28 Peugeots remained in service.

In 1920, 18 Peugeots were provided to Poland for use against the Soviets in the Polish–Soviet War. By the early 1930s the type was considered obsolete and were replaced in Polish Army service, although the type continued in service with the police. Three remained in service in September 1939, seeing combat against the invading German forces.

In 1918 four Peugeots were also provided to the Kingdom of Serbia, they remained use with the Kingdom of Yugoslavia until 1941, seeing combat against the invading Germans.

Gallery

See also
 List of combat vehicles of World War I

References

External links

 
 
 

World War I armoured cars
World War I armoured fighting vehicles of France
Armoured cars of France